West Bank Second League is the third tier of the Palestinian Football Association (PFA).

Champions
 2011–12: AlShoban AlMoslemin, Markaz Jenin 
 2012–13: Shabab Dura, Shabab Al-Samu
 2013–14: Silwan, Palestinian Forces

3
Third level football leagues in Asia